The following radio stations broadcast on AM frequency 1390 kHz: 1390 AM is a Regional broadcast frequency.

Argentina
 LR11 in La Plata, Buenos Aires
 LRA6 in Valle de Uspallata, Mendoza (960 kHz. Defunct?)

Guatemala (Channel 86)
TGYC in Guatemala City

Mexico
 XECSAG-AM in San Nicolás de los Garza, Nuevo León
 XECTAM-AM in Cuautla, Morelos
 XEOR-AM in Río Bravo, Tamaulipas
 XETY-AM in Tecomán, Colima

United States

References

Lists of radio stations by frequency